The following are the Pulitzer Prizes for 1936

Journalism awards

Public Service:
 Cedar Rapids Gazette for its campaign against corruption and misgovernment in the State of Iowa.
 Honorable mention to the St. Paul Daily News for its campaign against corruption and misgovernment in St. Paul.
Reporting:
 Lauren D. Lyman of The New York Times for the exclusive story revealing that the Charles Lindbergh family was leaving the United States to live in England.
Correspondence:
 Wilfred C. Barber of the Chicago Tribune for his reports of the Second Italo-Ethiopian War (posthumous).
 Honorable mentions to:
 Webb Miller of the United Press for reports on the Second Italo-Ethiopian War.
 Ashman Brown of the Providence Evening Bulletin for his correspondence from Washington.
 Jay G. Hayden of The Detroit News for a series of political articles written on a tour of the country.
 James A. Mills of the Associated Press for his story about the leasing of Ethiopian oil fields to Standard Oil.
Editorial Writing:
 Felix Morley of The Washington Post for distinguished editorial writing during the year.
 George B. Parker of Scripps-Howard Newspapers for distinguished editorial writing during the year.
Editorial Cartooning:
 No award given.

Letters and Drama Awards

Novel:
 Honey in the Horn by Harold L. Davis (Harper).
Drama:
 Idiot's Delight by Robert E. Sherwood (Scribner).
History:
 A Constitutional History of the United States by Andrew C. McLaughlin (Appleton).
Biography or Autobiography:
 The Thought and Character of William James by Ralph Barton Perry (Little).
Poetry:
 Strange Holiness by Robert Peter Tristram Coffin (Macmillan).

References

External links
Pulitzer Prizes for 1936

Pulitzer Prizes by year
Pulitzer Prize
Pulitzer Prize